Ronald Lawrence Schock  (born December 19, 1943) is a Canadian former professional ice hockey centre who played in the National Hockey League from 1964 to 1978. His younger brother, Danny Schock, also played briefly in the NHL. Schock retired following 909 games, recording a total of 166 goals, 351 assists, and 517 points.

Playing career
Schock scored his first NHL goal as a member of the Boston Bruins on February 29, 1964. It came in his team's 2-1 victory over the Detroit Red Wings at Boston Garden.

While playing with the St. Louis Blues, Schock attended a hockey dinner and was asked where he would least like to be traded. He responded, either the New York Rangers or Pittsburgh Penguins. Two days later he was traded to the Pittsburgh Penguins.

Ron Schock is perhaps most famous for his double overtime "Midnight Goal" that won game 7 for the Blues over the Minnesota North Stars on May 3, 1968, and sent the Blues to the Stanley Cup finals in the first year of the NHL expansion. Arguably, this was a major contribution to the early popularity of the St. Louis Blues franchise.

Career statistics

Regular season and playoffs

References

External links

1943 births
Living people
Boston Bruins players
Buffalo Sabres players
Canadian ice hockey centres
Hershey Bears players
Ice hockey people from Ontario
Kansas City Blues players
Kingston Frontenacs (EPHL) players
Minneapolis Bruins players
Niagara Falls Flyers players
People from Chapleau, Ontario
Pittsburgh Penguins players
Rochester Americans players
San Francisco Seals (ice hockey) players
St. Louis Blues players